Juan Moscoso († 1663, Valdivia) was a Chilean criollo Jesuit. He was fluent in Spanish and Mapudungun. Together with fellow Jesuit Diego de Rosales Moscoso dissuaded governor Governor of Chile Antonio de Acuña Cabrera to launch new punitive expeditions against the Cunco in 1653. They argued that the murders were committed by a few Indians and warned the governor that renewing warfare would evaporate gains obtained at Boroa.

References

Bibliography 

1663 deaths
17th-century Chilean Jesuits
People of the Arauco War
Jesuit missionaries in Chile
People from Concepción, Chile